Goodenia arachnoidea  is a species of flowering plant in the family Goodeniaceae and is endemic to Western Australia. It is an erect to ascending herb with egg-shaped leaves with the narrower end towards the base, and racemes of yellow flowers with leaf-like bracts at the base.

Description
The stem leaves are more or less petiolate.

Taxonomy and naming
Goodenia arachnoidea was first formally described in 1990 by Roger Charles Carolin in the journal Telopea from material collected by David Symon near Theda Station in the Kimberleys in 1971. The specific epithet (arachnoidea) means "cobwebby", referring to the hairs on the foliage.

Distribution and habitat
This goodenia usually grows in forest on sandstone outcrips in the Northern Kimberley region of Western Australia.

Conservation status
Goodenia arachnoidea is classified as "not threatened" by the Western Australian Government Department of Parks and Wildlife.

References

arachnoidea
Eudicots of Western Australia
Plants described in 1990
Taxa named by Roger Charles Carolin